Octav Lucian ("Ludwig") Uettwiller (November 28, 1886 – June 25, 1949) was a German track and field athlete who competed in the 1908 Summer Olympics.

In 1908 he finished 17th in the standing high jump competition. He also participated in the long jump event, in the freestyle javelin throw competition, in the discus throw event, and in the hammer throw event but in all four competitions his final ranking is unknown.

References

External links
list of German athletes

1886 births
1949 deaths
German male high jumpers
German male long jumpers
German male javelin throwers
German male hammer throwers
German male discus throwers
Olympic athletes of Germany
Athletes (track and field) at the 1908 Summer Olympics